Eyal Weizman MBE FBA  (born 1970) is a British Israeli architect. He is the director of the research agency Forensic Architecture at Goldsmiths, University of London where he is Professor of Spatial and Visual Cultures and a founding director there of the Centre for Research Architecture at the department of Visual Cultures. In 2019 he was elected Fellow of the British Academy.

Biography
Eyal Weizman was born in Haifa, Israel. He studied architecture at the Architectural Association in London, and completed his PhD at the London Consortium.

Architecture career
In 2007 he was a founding member of the architectural collective Decolonizing Architecture (DAAR) in Beit Sahour in the West Bank, Palestinian territories. Weizman has been a professor of architecture at the Academy of Fine Arts in Vienna and has also taught at The Bartlett (UCL) in London at the Städelschule in Frankfurt. He lectured, curated and organised conferences in many institutions worldwide. Weizman's most known theoretical work describes the acts of the Israeli army as founded upon the post-structuralist French philosophers and a reading of them. He also conducted research on behalf of B’tselem on the "planning aspects of the Israeli occupation of the West Bank".
He has also published many articles on Israeli geography and architecture.
In 2013 he designed a permanent folly in Gwangju, South Korea which was documented in the book The Roundabout Revolution (Sternberg, 2015).
In 2010 he established the agency Forensic Architecture, which provide advanced architectural and media evidence to civil society groups, with the help of several European Research Council grants, as well as other human rights grants. Forensic Architecture undertook research for Amnesty International, Human Rights Watch, Doctors without Borders (MSF), the Red Cross (ICRC), and the United Nations.

In 2017, he was  a guest speaker at the 17th edition of the Sonic Acts Festival: The Noise of Being (Amsterdam). Since 2019 he is a guest professor at ETH Zurich. Between 2014 and 2017 he was a Global Scholar at Princeton University.

In February 2020, Weizman was informed by email that his right to travel to the United States under a visa waiver program had been revoked. He was later informed by an official of the US Embassy in London that an algorithm had identified a security threat that was related to him.

Political activism
Weizman is on the editorial board of Third Text, Humanity, Cabinet and Political Concepts and is a board member of the Centre for Investigative Journalism (CIJ) and of the Technology Advisory Board of the International Criminal Court in the Hague, and sat on the board of the Israeli human rights organization B’Tselem in Jerusalem.

He is currently on the advisory boards of the Human Rights Project at Bard College in New York, as a jury member for architecture in the Akademie Schloss Solitude and of other academic and cultural institutions.
In 2014 Weizman was featured in "The Architecture of Violence", a film produced for the series Rebel Architecture broadcast by Al Jazeera English.

Awards and recognition
Weizman was appointed Member of the Order of the British Empire (MBE) in the 2020 New Year Honours for services to architecture.*2006 James Stirling Memorial Lecture Prize from the LSE/London and CCA/Montreal 
2011 Prince Claus Architecture Prize (co-recipient with DAAR)
2016 Schelling Award for Architectural Theory (refused due to Schelling Nazi history)
2016 The Digital Dozen 2016 Award for Breakthroughs in Storytelling from Columbia University
2017 Finalist, Beazley Design of the Year Award (for Forensic Architecture)
2017 Vera List Center Prize for Art and Politics (for Forensic Architecture, finalist)
2017 Prix Ars Electronica (for Forensic Architecture)
2017 The PeaBody-Facebook, Future of Media Award (For Forensic Architecture)
2017 European Cultural Foundation Princess Margriet Award for Culture (for Forensic Architecture)
2018 nominated for the Turner Prize with Forensic Architecture
2019 elected Fellow of the British Academy
2020 MBE for services to architecture
2021 received the London Design Innovation Medal

Books
 1998 (with Christian Nicolas) Random Walk, London: Architectural Association
 2000 Yellow Rhythms, Rotterdam: 010 Publishers
 2003 (with Rafi Segal) Civilian Occupation: The Politics of Israeli Architecture, Verso
 2003 (with Anselm Franke) Territories, Builders and Warrior, Rotterdam: Witte de With Press
 2003 (with Anselm Franke) Territories, Camps, Islands and other States of Utopia, Berlin and Cologne: Kunst Werke and Walter Koenig Press
 2004 (with Anselm Franke) Territories, The Frontiers of Utopia and other Facts on the Ground, Cologne: Walther Koenig Press
 2007 Hollow Land: Israel's Architecture of Occupation, Verso
 2011 The Least of All Possible Evils: Humanitarian Violence from Arendt to Gaza, Verso
 2012 (with Thomas Keenan) Mengele's Skull: The Advent of Forensic Aesthetics, Sternberg Press/Portikus
 2012 Forensic Architecture: Notes from Fields and Forums (dOCUMENTA 13 notebook n.062), Hatje Cantz
 2013 (with Ines Weizman) Before and After, Moscow: Strelka Press
 2014 (with Alessandro Petti and Sandi Hilal) Architecture After Revolution, Berlin: Sternberg Press
 2014 (with Forensic Architecture) FORENSIS, Berlin: Sternberg Press
 2015 The Roundabout Revolution, Berlin: Sternberg Press
 2015 (with photography by Fazal Sheikh) The Conflict Shoreline: Colonization as Climate Change in the Negev Desert, Göttingen: Steidl and Cabinet Books. 
 2017  Hollow Land: The Architecture of Israel's Occupation, Third and updated edition (with an additional chapter) London and NYC: Verso Books
 2017 Forensic Architecture: Towards an Investigative Aesthetics (in Spanish), Barcelona and Mexico City: MACBA/MUAC (NYT/Spanish top ten non-fiction books of 2017) 
 2017 Forensic Architecture: Violence at the Threshold of Detectability, NYC: MIT/Zone Books
 2021 Investigative Aesthetics: Conflicts and Commons in the Politics of Truth, London: Verso
 2021 The Police Shooting of Mark Duggan: Forensic Architecture Reports, New York: Cabinet books and London: ICA books

Translations
Hollow Land
2017 in Arabic, Cairo and Ramallah: Madarat for Research and Publishing
2017 in Turkish, Istanbul: Kitap
2017 in Hebrew, Tel Aviv: Babel Books
2012 in Spanish (chr. 7): A través de los muros, Madrid: Errate naturae editors
2011 in Greek (chr. 7), Athens: ΤΟΠOBOPOΣ 
2009 in German (chr. 7): Durch Wände gehen, Leipzig: Konserve-Verlag 
2009 in German: Sperrzonen: Israels architektur der besatzung, Hamburg: Edition Nautilus
2009 in Italian: Architettura dell'occupazione: spazio politico e controllo territoriale in Palestina e Israele, Milan: Bruno Mondadori
2007 in French (chr. 7): A travers les murs, Paris: La Fabrique

The Conflict's Shoreline
2016 in Hebrew, Kav Hamidbar, Sav Hasihsuh, Tel Aviv: Babel Books

The Least of all Possible Evils
2013 in Italian, 
2013 in Croatian, Najmanje od svih mogućih zala, Zagreb: Multimedijalni institute
2009 in Italian, Il Male Minore, Rome: Nottetempo (a short version, Italian)

Mengele's Skull
2020 in German, Megeles Schädel, Leipzig: Merve
2015 in Spanish el cráneo de Mengele, Madrid and Buenos Aires: Sans Soleil Ediciones
2014 in Turkish, Mengele'nin Kafatası Adli Estetiğin Ortaya Çıkışı, Istanbul, Açılım Kitap 
2013 in Hebrew, Hagulgolet Shel Mengele: Lidata shel Haestetika Haforensit, Tel Aviv: Resling Books 
2013 in Croatian, Mengeleova lubanja: Zaceci forenzicke estetike, Zagreb: Monoskop

Exhibitions
Forensic Architecture exhibited internationally including at the documenta 14 in Kassel. In 2017 Forensic Architecture had two major museum exhibitions at the Barcelona Museum of Contemporary Art (MACBA) and at the Museo Universitario Arte Contemporáneo (MUAC). In 2018 Forensic Architecture held a solo show at the Institute of Contemporary Arts (ICA) in London. Forensic Architecture's work is included in the permanent collection of the Victoria and Albert Museum.

References

External links
 Forensic Architecture
 Centre for Research Architecture: Roundtable 
 Interview with Eyal Weizman in Full Stop magazine
 Interview with Eyal Weizman in the Believer
 Interview/podcast with Eyal Weizman at Radio Web MACBA (2015)

Living people
Israeli architects
1970 births
Academics of Goldsmiths, University of London
Alumni of the Architectural Association School of Architecture
21st-century British architects
Naturalised citizens of the United Kingdom
Members of the Order of the British Empire
Israeli emigrants to the United Kingdom
People from Haifa
B'Tselem people